"Lush Life" is a jazz standard that was written by Billy Strayhorn from 1933 to 1936. It was performed publicly for the first time by Strayhorn and vocalist Kay Davis with the Duke Ellington Orchestra at Carnegie Hall on November 13, 1948.

Background

The lyric describes the author's weariness of the night life after a failed romance, wasting time with "jazz and cocktails" at "come-what-may places" and in the company of girls with "sad and sullen gray faces/with distingué traces". Strayhorn was a teenager when he wrote most of the song, which was to become his signature composition (along with "Take the 'A' Train").

The song was written in the key of D-flat major. The melody is over relatively complex chord changes, compared with many jazz standards, with chromatic movement and modulations that evoke a dreamlike state and the dissolute spirit characteristic of the "lush life."

During a 1949 interview, Strayhorn spoke of the song’s genesis: “’Lush Life’ wasn’t the first tune of mine Duke [Ellington] heard. In fact, he didn’t hear it until just a little while ago. I wrote it in 1936 while I was clerking at the Pennfield drugstore on the corner of Washington and Penn in Pittsburgh….I was writing a song a day then, and I’ve forgotten many of them myself….One night I remembered it and played it for Duke….I called it 'Life is Lonely,’ but when anyone wanted me to play it they’d ask for ‘that thing about lush life’.”

Nat King Cole performed "Lush Life" in 1949, while trumpeter Harry James recorded it four times. In the 1950s, it was performed by jazz vocalists Ella Fitzgerald, Carmen McRae, and Sarah Vaughan. John Coltrane recorded it twice. The first was a 14-minute version in recorded in 1958 as the title track of an album for Prestige. The other was on John Coltrane and Johnny Hartman, with vocalist Johnny Hartman, recorded in 1963. Kurt Elling recorded a version for his album Dedicated to You: Kurt Elling Sings the Music of Coltrane and Hartman.

Linda Ronstadt's version won the Grammy Award for Best Instrumental Arrangement Accompanying Vocal(s) (1986).

Other musicians who have recorded the song include Joey Alexander, Chet Baker, Andy Bey, Anthony Braxton, Sylvia Brooks, Kate Ceberano & Mark Isham, Natalie Cole, Sammy Davis Jr., Blossom Dearie, Bebi Dol, Lisa Ekdahl, Ella Fitzgerald & Oscar Peterson, Bill Frisell, Lady Gaga, Stan Getz, Joe Henderson, Stevie Holland, José James, Molly Johnson, Rickie Lee Jones, Sheila Jordan, Rahsaan Roland Kirk, Queen Latifah, Julie London, Patti Lupone, Johnny Mathis, Tito Puente, Joshua Redman, Buddy Rich, Linda Ronstadt, Tony Scott, Rare Silk, Terell Stafford, Donna Summer, McCoy Tyner, Ernie Watts, Bob Welch, Nancy Wilson & Emma Smith .

Other versions
 Billy Eckstine – No Cover, No Minimum (1960)
 Johnny Hartman - Thank You for Everything (1998), rec. 1976
 Jack Jones –  Where Love Has Gone (1964)
 Nancy Wilson - Lush Life (1967)
 Bud Powell - "Strictly" Powell Vol. 1 (1975)
 Donna Hightower – El Jazz y Donna Hightower (1975)
 Donna Summer – Donna Summer produced by Quincy Jones (1982)
 Rickie Lee Jones  – Girl at Her Volcano (1983)
 Rare Silk - "New Weave" (1983)
 Joe Pass - Virtuoso No. 4 (1983, recorded in 1973)
 Tony Scott – Lush Life and Lush Life Volume 2 (1989) – a tour de force, with 13 interpretations of the song.    From the liner notes: "An homage to Billy Strayhorn's 'Lush Life', an obsession, fullfilled (sic) by Tony Scott"
 Natalie Cole – Unforgettable... with Love (1991)
 Eileen Farrell – It's Over (1991)
 Tina May – Tina May – Never Let Me Go (1992)
 Queen Latifah – The Dana Owens Album (2004)
 Lady Gaga – Cheek to Cheek'' (2014)

References

External links
The song's entry at jazzstandards.com

1930s jazz standards
Nat King Cole songs
Nancy Wilson (jazz singer) songs
Carmen McRae songs
Songs with music by Billy Strayhorn
Jazz compositions in D-flat major
LGBT-related songs
Grammy Award for Best Instrumental Arrangement Accompanying Vocalist(s)